Bells Are Ringing is a musical with a book and lyrics by Betty Comden and Adolph Green and music by Jule Styne. The story revolves around Ella, who works at an answering service, and the characters that she meets there. The main character was based on Mary Printz, who worked for Green's answering service. Three of the show's tunes, "Long Before I Knew You", "Just in Time", and "The Party's Over", became standards.

Judy Holliday reprised her Broadway starring role in the 1960 film of the same name, also starring Dean Martin.

Productions

The original Broadway production, directed by Jerome Robbins and choreographed by Robbins and Bob Fosse, opened on November 29, 1956 at the Shubert Theatre, where it ran for slightly more than two years before transferring to the Alvin Theatre, for a total run of 924 performances. It starred Judy Holliday as Ella and Sydney Chaplin as Jeff Moss. It also featured Jean Stapleton as Sue Summers, Eddie Lawrence as Sandor, George S. Irving, Jack Weston, Peter Gennaro, and Donna Sanders. Scenic and Costume design was by Raoul Pène Du Bois and the lighting design was by Peggy Clark. During her vacation, Holliday was replaced briefly by Betty Garrett. The original cast album was released by Columbia Records. In the Metro-Goldwyn-Mayer film adaptation of the same name, Holliday reprised her role as Ella with Dean Martin as Jeff.

The West End production opened on November 14, 1957 at the Coliseum, where it ran for 292 performances. The cast included Janet Blair as Ella Peterson, George Gaynes as Jeff Moss, Jean St. Clair as Sue Summers, Eddie Molloy as Sandor, and Allyn McLerie as Gwynne Smith.

The Australian production opened April 5, 1958 at the Princess Theatre, Melbourne. Produced by Garnet H. Carroll and starring Shani Wallis as Ella Peterson, Bruce Trent, Gábor Baraker and Kay Eklund. The production was not a financial success as did not tour.

A Mexican production opened in 1958 at the Teatro del Bosque in Mexico City. The cast included Silvia Pinal as Ella Peterson. It was the first musical comedy opened in Latin America.

The show was revised for a production at the Menzies Hotel in Sydney, Australia, opening March 19, 1968 and closing May 4, 1968. In order to cut the show down to 90 minutes, director Jon Ewing removed the song-writing dentist character, Dr Kitchell, and his song "The Midas Touch". Ewing wrote updated lyrics for "Drop That Name" and added "Better Than a Dream". The cast included Nancye Hayes as Ella Peterson, Doug Kingsman as Jeff Moss, Judith Roberts as Sue, Reg Gorman as Sandor, Rex McClenaghan as Francis, and Phil Jay as Inspector Barnes, with Peter Noble, Julie Haslehurst and Brian Tucker.

A Broadway revival, directed by Tina Landau and choreographed by Jeff Calhoun, opened on April 12, 2001 at the Plymouth Theatre where, struggling to overcome mediocre reviews and ongoing hostility between the show's producers and its cast and crew, it finally closed after 68 performances and 36 previews. The cast included Faith Prince as Ella, Marc Kudisch as Jeff, David Garrison, and Beth Fowler.

The Union Theatre in London staged a revival of Bells Are Ringing in late 2010, with leading lady Anna-Jane Casey in the role of Ella Peterson. The production was well-reviewed and sold out its brief run.

In November 2010, New York City Center's Encores! series produced a semi-staged concert of the show starring Kelli O'Hara, Will Chase, and Judy Kaye. Reviews for O'Hara were excellent, but critics felt the show itself was too dated for modern audiences. Ben Brantley in his New York Times review wrote: "Ms. O’Hara is the possessor of a liquid soprano that was made for the shimmering romantic confessions so essential to classic American musicals. Offering sincerity without saccharine, her voice seems to emerge almost involuntarily, as if she just couldn’t help acting on an irresistible urge. Though obviously highly trained, that voice brims with a conversational ease that makes you forget that singing is not usually the form we choose for confiding in others, even in this age of 'Glee'...This 1956 musical ... was revived on Broadway only nine years ago (with Faith Prince), and it seemed irretrievably dated then."

Porchlight Music Theatre presented Bells Are Ringing as a part of "Porchlight Revisits" in which they stage three forgotten musicals per year. It was in Chicago, Illinois in October 2014. It was directed by Michael Weber and Dina DiCostanzo and music directed by Linda Madonia.

Plot

ACT ONE

Ella Peterson works for "Susanswerphone", a telephone answering service owned by a woman named Sue. She listens in on others' lives and adds some interest to her own humdrum existence by adopting different identities – and voices – for her clients. They include Blake Barton, an out-of-work Method actor, Dr. Kitchell, a dentist with musical yearnings but lacking talent, and playwright Jeff Moss, who is suffering from writer's block and with whom Ella has fallen in love, although she has never met him. Ella considers the relationships with these clients "perfect" because she can't see them and they can't see her ("It's a Perfect Relationship").

Jeff is writing a play called "The Midas Touch," the first play he's written since his writing partner left him ("Independent (On My Own)"). One day the producer of the play insists that he finish the play by the next morning and meet him at 9:00 am. While asking her to wake him up on time, he turns to Ella (who he only knows as the Susanswerphone lady) for help in writing the play. Meanwhile, Sandor, Sue's rich boyfriend, reveals plans to a group of gangsters to use Susanswerphone as a front for a gambling operation, by pretending to be a record seller and taking orders for "symphonies" as code. ("It's a Simple Little System").

Ella wants to visit Jeff's apartment to help him write the play, but she is intercepted by a policeman who is convinced that Susanswerphone is a front for an "escort service". Ella asks him "Is it a Crime?" to help someone in need? He agrees that it isn't, and lets her go. She arrives at Jeff's apartment and offers him help with his play, and a romance ensues ("I Met a Girl," "Long Before I Knew You").

ACT TWO

Ella is preparing to go to a party at Jeff's apartment, feeling nervous about meeting his friends. Carl, a friend of hers, helps her regain her confidence with a cha-cha dance ("Mu-Cha-Cha"). The guests at the party are all very pretentious and rich and snobby ("Drop That Name") and they make Ella feel very out of place. She leaves Jeff ("The Party's Over").

Carl, a music nerd, thwarts Sandor's operation when he receives an order for "Beethoven's 10th symphony," because he knows that Beethoven only wrote 9 symphonies. The policeman arrests Sandor. Meanwhile, Jeff comes to Susanswerphone to confess his love for Ella. She quits Susanswerphone in order to make a life with herself and Jeff ("I'm Going Back").

Song list

 Act I
 "Bells Are Ringing" – Telephone Girls
 "It's a Perfect Relationship" – Ella Peterson
 "Independent" (original title: "On My Own") – Jeff Moss and Ensemble
 "You've Got to Do It" – Jeff Moss
 "It's a Simple Little System" – Sandor and Ensemble
 "Is It a Crime?" – Ella Peterson
 "Better Than a Dream" – Ella Peterson and Jeff Moss (later addition to original production)
 "Hello, Hello There" – Ella Peterson, Jeff Moss and Ensemble
 "I Met a Girl" – Jeff Moss and Ensemble
 "Long Before I Knew You" – Jeff Moss and Ella Peterson

 Act II
 "Mu-Cha-Cha" – Carl and Ella Peterson
 "Just in Time" – Jeff Moss, Ella Peterson and Ensemble
 "Drop That Name" – Ella Peterson and Ensemble
 "The Party's Over" – Ella Peterson
 "Salzburg" – Sue and Sandor
 "The Midas Touch" – Nightclub Singer and Ensemble
 "Long Before I Knew You" (Reprise) – Ella Peterson
 "I'm Going Back" – Ella

Note: "Better Than a Dream" was actually written during the Broadway run and later incorporated into the 1960 film.

Awards and nominations

Original Broadway production

2001 Broadway revival

References

External links
Plot summary and character descriptions from StageAgent.com
Show Page at Tams-Witmark Music Library, Inc.

Detailed plot at Guide to Musical Theatre

1956 musicals
Broadway musicals
Original musicals
Grammy Hall of Fame Award recipients
Musicals by Betty Comden and Adolph Green
Musicals by Jule Styne
Musicals choreographed by Jerome Robbins
Musicals choreographed by Bob Fosse
Plays set in New York City
Telephony in popular culture
Tony Award-winning musicals